Mount Benson may refer to:
Antarctica
Mount Benson (Antarctica)
Australia
Mount Benson wine region, a wine region in South Australia
Mount Benson, South Australia, a locality in South Australia
Mount Benson (South Australia), a hill in South Australia
Canada
Mount Benson (British Columbia), a mountain on Vancouver island overlooking Nanaimo
Mount Benson Elementary School (Nanaimo)
United States
Mount Benson (Alaska), a mountain near Seward

See also
Benson (disambiguation)